"Back on Road" is a song by American rapper Gucci Mane featuring  Canadian rapper Drake, released as the second single from the former's ninth studio album Everybody Looking (2016). The song was written alongside producers Murda Beatz and Boi-1da.

The song premiered on episode 23 of OVO Sound Radio. Even though Drake was credited as a feature on the single release, he was officially credited as a co-lead on the album release.

Charts

Certifications

Release history

References

2016 singles
2016 songs
Gucci Mane songs
Drake (musician) songs
Songs written by Gucci Mane
Songs written by Drake (musician)
Songs written by Boi-1da
Songs written by Murda Beatz
Song recordings produced by Boi-1da
Song recordings produced by Murda Beatz

Atlantic Records singles